The 1942 Ole Miss Rebels football team represented the University of Mississippi during the 1942 college football season.

Schedule

Roster
E Barney Poole
E Ray Poole

References

Ole Miss
Ole Miss Rebels football seasons
Ole Miss Rebels football